Carrosserie HESS AG is a bus, trolleybus and commercial vehicle manufacturer based in Bellach, Switzerland. Their products can be found operating in several countries, including the United States and Canada.

History
The company was founded in 1882, when Heinrich Hess set up business in Solothurn to build customised car bodies. The company first began building buses in 1919, and production reverted to aluminium products in 1933. It produced its first trolleybuses in 1940 for the Swiss cities of Basel and Biel/Bienne. In 1961, it commenced building of articulated vehicles, some of which were supplied to operators in the United States and Canada in 1975. The company soon began to expand, and businesses were set up in Portugal and Australia in 1957 and 1978 respectively. The U.S. business was set up in 1996. The company began production of low-floor buses and trolleybuses in 1991, and in 2003 built its first double-articulated trolleybuses.

Products

Buses

N UB 2-2: A low-floor, two-door bus with 10 m, 11.3 m and 12 m variants, which can accommodate approximately 82, 86 and 95 passengers, respectively.
N UB 2-2-1: Identical to the N UB 2-2 with the addition of an extra door at the rear of the vehicle.
N UA 2-2-2-2: A low-floor, 18 m four-door articulated bus, which has a capacity of around 150 passengers.
 Hess LighTram : A 24.69 m bi-articulated bus with a duraluminium body. Hybrid version available.

Trolleybuses

Eurotrolley 3: A 9.7m long half-low-floor trolleybus with a capacity of approximately 80 passengers. Built for Lyon with Kiepe electrical equipment and a Skoda traction motor.
Swisstrolley 3: An 18m long articulated trolleybus which can accommodate not less than 140 passengers. It and LighTram have a duraluminium body.
LighTram 3: A 24.7m long double-articulated trolleybus with a capacity of around 192 passengers.
Trolleyzug: A 23.3m long trolleybus and trailer with a capacity of around 180 passengers.

Bus kits
As well as building complete vehicles, Hess also manufactures bus kits for its worldwide customers.  These kits are imported and then assembled on reaching their destination.

Minibuses
Hess also builds smaller buses, mainly for the transportation of school children and persons with disabilities.

Commercial vehicles
Hess builds vehicles designed for commercial purposes, such as vans, some of which are fitted with tipper equipment, loading ramps and trailers.

External links

Official website

Bus manufacturers of Switzerland
Trolleybus manufacturers
Swiss brands
Electric vehicle manufacturers of Switzerland
Companies based in the canton of Solothurn